Senach  Uí Chormaic of Cillmór was a priest and one of the six brothers of St. Abbán moccu Corbmaic. His mother was Broinsech Breac, who was sister of Iubhar who was son of Lughna. His feast day was November 2.

References

Medieval Irish saints